Varbla was an Estonian municipality located in Pärnu County. In 2017, Varbla Parish, Lihula Parish, Hanila Parish, and Koonga Parish were merged to form Lääneranna Parish.

Settlements

Villages

References

External links 
 Official website 

Former municipalities of Estonia